De Nobili School is a private Catholic primary and secondary school located in Dhanbad, Jharkhand, India. The school is named after a Christian mission and Jesuit, Roberto de Nobili, who was the first foreigner to master Sanskrit, incognito, in sixteenth century Madurai. He apparently conducted himself like an orthodox Brahmin and is even said to have declared himself to be a descendant of Brahma.

School shield

The De Nobili School shield displays part of a Sanskrit sloka Vidya Dadati Vinaym (Education Bestows Humility) in Devanagari script in the scroll under the school shield. On the school shield Vidya Dadati Vinayam is the opening fragment from the sixth verse.  The entire verse translates to "Knowledge giveth humility, from humility he attaineth worth, from worth, the wealth he attaineth, from wealth the power of being religious, from thence happiness". of the preface to Hitopadesha, a collection of fables that provide "Good Advice". The white wavy strip on the shield represents the river Damodar which flows near the area and the black background represents a coalfield since the school is situated in the heart of the Jharia coalfield, in the state of Jharkhand.

Leadership

The present Principal and Vice-Principal of the school are Fr. A. Amaladoss, S.J., and Mr. Santanu Das respectively. Mrs. Preeta Sojan serves as the Vice Principal of the Junior section of the school.The co-ordinator of high and secondary part of the  school is led by individual teachers.

Course offerings

The school provides science and commerce streams for +2 courses. It is affiliated to CISCE.

Past Principals

History
In the early 1950s, the prominent people in the coalfield asked the Jesuit fathers of Jamshedpur Province to open a Cambridge school for their sons and wards. Jesuits were already running Loyola School, in Jamshedpur, on the invitation of Late J.R.D. Tata. Fr. F. X. McFarland, S.J. an American Jesuit, was the pioneer, under whose able guidance, De Nobili School started, in a rather humble way, in the unfinished girls' school building at the Fuel Research Institute, Jealgora, (now Digwadih) courtesy, the then Director of F.R.I., Late Dr. Adinath Lahiri. It had 36 students with teachers in February 1956.  In 1959, a significant piece of land was handed over to the Jesuits by industrialist and philanthropist, Late Banwari Lal Agarwalla and on 28 October 1959, the ground was broken for the new building. In 1960, with the help of Lions Clubs, an adjoining piece of land was acquired for further expansion. In 1961, the school shifted from its temporary quarters in F.R.I. to the unfinished new building. In 1963, while De Nobili was still in its infancy, Rev. Fr. George A. Hess, S.J., took over as the new principal of De Nobili.

See also

 List of schools in Jharkhand
 List of Jesuit schools

References

External links
 Official website

Boys' schools in India
Jesuit secondary schools in India
Jesuit primary schools in India
Christian schools in Jharkhand
High schools and secondary schools in Jharkhand
Education in Dhanbad
Educational institutions established in 1956
1956 establishments in Bihar